DYER (828 AM) was a radio station owned and operated by DCG Radio-TV Network. It was formerly known as Environment Radio under the management of then-mayor Edward Hagedorn until 2008, when it transferred to 1062 AM. Since then, the frequency has been off the air.

References

Radio stations in Puerto Princesa
Radio stations established in 1978
Defunct radio stations in the Philippines